Porta is a neighborhood in the Nou Barris district of Barcelona, Catalonia (Spain).

Neighbourhoods of Barcelona
Nou Barris